Swedish Air Force Flying School, also F 5 Ljungbyhed, or simply F 5, is a former Swedish Air Force training wing with the main base located in Ljungbyhed in southern Sweden.

History
The moor at Ljungby was adopted for military use in 1658 by the Scanian Hussar Regiment as a training ground. In 1910, the first flights were commenced from the grounds.

Enoch Thulin set up a public flying school on June 16, 1915.

In 1926, the newly formed Swedish Air Force set up their flying school at Ljungbyhed.

Between 1983 and 1996 the Air Force school of meteorology was also located at Ljungbyhed.

In 1996, F 5 Ljungbyhed was decommissioned and the pilot training was taken over by the Scania Wing (F 10).

Currently, Lund University School of Aviation has commercial flying training at Ljungbyhed Airport (ICAO: ESTL).

Heraldry and traditions

Coat of arms
The units first coat of arms was used until 1994. Blazon: "Azure, under three open crowns or placed two and one, an eagle wings elevated and displayed, on its breast a smaller sinister turned eagle, all or". Its second coat of arms was used from 1994 to 1998 and by the Flying School at F 10 from 1998 to 2002, and by the Flying School at F 16 from 2002 to 2003 and by the Flying School at F 17 from 2003. Blazon: "Or, an eagle azure wings elevated and displayed, on its breast a shield or with a smaller sinister turned eagle azure. On a chief azure a winged two-bladed propeller or".

Colours, standards and guidons
The units first colour was presented at F 8 at Barkarby on 6 June 1939 by His Majesty the King Gustaf V. Blazon: "On blue cloth in the centre the badge of the Air Force; a winged two-bladed propeller under a royal crown proper, all or. In the first corner, three yellow open crowns, arranged two and one".

The units second colour was presented at F 5 Ljungbyhed on 25 August 1996 by His Majesty the King Carl XVI Gustaf. The colour was used as school colour at the Scania Wing (F 10) from 1 July 1998 to 31 December 2002 and at the Uppland Wing (F 16) from 1 January 2003 to 31 December 2003. The colour was drawn by Kristina Åkerberg and embroidered by machine in insertion technique by Engelbrektsson flag factory. Blazon: "On blue cloth in the centre the badge of the Air Force; a winged two-bladed propeller under a royal crown proper. In the first corner an eagle, wings elevated and displayed, on its breast an escutcheon with a sinister-turned eagle. All décor in yellow".

March
”Krigsflygskolans marsch” composed by the headmaster of the municipal music school in Nynäshamn, Sverker Hållander. The march was adopted and established on 20 August 1984.

Commanding officers
Commanding officers from 1926 to 1998. The commanding officer was referred to as skolchef ("chief of school") and had the rank of colonel.

1926–1932: Arvid Flory
1932–1943: Åge Lundström
1943–1952: Ingemar Nygren
1952–1957: Knut Lindahl
1957–1965: Åke Rehnberg
1965–1971: Bengt Bellander
1971–1975: Åke Lönnberg
1975–1987: Per Widmark
1987–1998: Sven Sjöling

Names, designations and locations

See also
 Swedish Air Force
 List of military aircraft of Sweden

Footnotes

References

Notes

Print

Web

Further reading

External links

Webpage listing all air force squadrons in Sweden 
Current use of the airbase grounds 
Article about pilot training in the Swedish Air Force 

Wings of the Swedish Air Force
Military education and training in Sweden
Military units and formations established in 1926
Military units and formations disestablished in 1998
1926 establishments in Sweden
1998 disestablishments in Sweden
Disbanded units and formations of Sweden